Cephaloziella elegans is a species of liverworts. It is found in the Russian Federation.

References 

 Grolle, R. 1983. Hepatics of Europe including the Azores: an annotated list of species, with synonyms from recent literature. J. Bryol. 12: 403–459.
 Konstantinova, N. A., A. D. Potemkin & R. N. Schljakov. 1992. Check-list of the Hepaticae and Anthocerotae of the former USSR. Arctoa 1: 87–127.

External links 
 
 Cephaloziella elegans at Tropicos

Jungermanniales
Plants described in 1900
Flora of Russia